The Collection is a set of shops and restaurants near the Friendship Heights Metro station on Wisconsin Avenue in Chevy Chase, Maryland, along the Washington, D.C.-Maryland border. The shopping center was developed by the Chevy Chase Land Company, a privately owned development corporation that has owned the land for more than a century.

The Chevy Chase Land Company was founded in 1890 by U.S. Senator Francis G. Newlands, who acquired a great deal of property in the D.C. area. In 1906, the parcel where The Collection now sits was sold to a white straw buyer for a group of African American investors. When the Company and the sellers learned that the group intended to sell plots to other African Americans, they maneuvered to block the land transfer and erase the planned development of Belmont from the property books of Montgomery County, Maryland.

The shopping area now called The Collection was built in the 1950s, one of the two first strip shopping centers in suburban Maryland.

For some three decades, the land was a parking lot. It took a decade for the Chevy Chase Land Company to bring The Collection project to fruition, due to community opposition and county zoning requirements.

The first stores began opening in the $165 million complex in the latter part of 2005, and the center held a grand opening celebration on May 4, 2006.  Model Petra Němcová and Chris Matthews were among the featured guests at the opening party. The original tenants included Ralph Lauren, Barneys CO-OP, Cartier, Dior, Piazza Sempione, BVLGARI, Gucci, Louis Vuitton, Jimmy Choo, and Tiffany & Co.

Piazza Sempione closed in April 2011 and was replaced by Mexican restaurant Mi Cocina, which closed in November 2014. Barneys CO-OP closed in 2012. Dior, Gucci, and Louis Vuitton closed in 2016.

The shopping center was updated between 2017 and June 2019, when it shifted its focus from luxury retail establishments to more neighborhood restaurants and stores.

The Collection and its section of Wisconsin Avenue has been referred to as Washington's version of Rodeo Drive. For years, the surrounding shopping area had several high-end department stores, but while Saks Fifth Avenue still operates a block to the north and Bloomingdale's nearby, Lord & Taylor closed in 2020.

References

External links
The Collection at Chevy Chase

Buildings and structures in Montgomery County, Maryland
Friendship Village, Maryland
Tourist attractions in Montgomery County, Maryland
Shopping malls in the Washington metropolitan area
Shopping malls established in 2005
2005 establishments in Maryland
Chevy Chase, Maryland